Kidd Harbor is a sheltered harbor in High Island, in the Thimble Islands of Branford, Connecticut. It was named in 1845 for Captain Kidd, who was alleged to have used the harbor as a place to hide his vessel, attacking unsuspecting ships who couldn't see him.

History
The islands were known to the Mattabesek people as "Kuttomquosh", “the beautiful sea rocks".
Adrian Block was the first European to discover the Thimble Islands in 1614.

References

Thimble Islands